Thomas Barnett may refer to:

Thomas Barnett (musician) (born 1973), American singer and songwriter
Thomas P. Barnett (1870–1929), American architect and painter
Thomas P. M. Barnett (born 1962), American military geostrategist
Thomas Speakman Barnett (1909–2003), Canadian politician
Thomas Barnett (Niagara Falls) (1799–1890), museum proprietor, collector and innkeeper
Thomas Barnett (footballer) (1876–?), English footballer
Tom Barnett (American football) (born 1937), former professional American football player
Tom Barnett (footballer) (1936–2022), English footballer
Tommy Barnett (footballer) (1908–1986), English footballer
Tommy Barnett (pastor), American author and pastor